The Heinkel HD 26 was a reconnaissance seaplane developed in Germany during the 1920s for production in Japan. It was intended as a smaller, single-seat counterpart to the HD 25, to provide a spotter aircraft for warships, to take off from a short ramp. The HD 26 was a conventional biplane with staggered wings, twin float undercarriage, and an open cockpit.

The pattern aircraft supplied by Heinkel was powered by a 300 hp Hispano-Suiza V-8 engine, but the single example of the Aichi Navy Type 2 Single-seat Reconnaissance Seaplane built by Aichi had an Aichi-built 420 hp Bristol Jupiter VI instead. Launching ramps were built on the battleship  and the cruiser  for trials, but the  HD 25 and HD 26 were already obsolete.

Variants
Heinkel HD 26
Heinkel Doppeldekker 26, German built prototype of a single seat reconnaissance/fighter seaplane
Heinkel Small Reconnaissance Seaplane
Unofficial designation for the Heinkel built prototype
Heinkel-go Reconnaissance Seaplane
An alternative unofficial designation for the HD 26
Aichi Navy Type 2 Single-seat Reconnaissance Seaplane
The official designation for the Heinkel and Aichi built prototypes

Specifications (Aichi-built)

References

Notes

Bibliography
 
Mikesh, Robert and Shorzoe Abe. Japanese Aircraft 1910–1941. London: Putnam, 1990. 

1920s German military reconnaissance aircraft
Floatplanes
HD 26
Aichi aircraft
Biplanes
Single-engined tractor aircraft
Aircraft first flown in 1928